Danburite is a calcium boron silicate mineral with a chemical formula of CaB2(SiO4)2.

It has a Mohs hardness of 7 to 7.5 and a specific gravity of 3.0. The mineral has an orthorhombic crystal form. It is usually colourless, like quartz, but can also be either pale yellow or yellowish-brown. It typically occurs in contact metamorphic rocks.

The Dana classification of minerals categorizes danburite as a sorosilicate, while the Strunz classification scheme lists it as a tectosilicate; its structure can be interpreted as either.

Its crystal symmetry and form are similar to topaz; however, topaz is a calcium fluorine bearing nesosilicate. The clarity, resilience, and strong dispersion of danburite make it valuable as cut stones for jewelry.

It is named for Danbury, Connecticut, United States, where it was first discovered in 1839 by Charles Upham Shephard.

References

Calcium minerals
Tectosilicates
Orthorhombic minerals
Minerals in space group 62
Luminescent minerals
Gemstones